Mohammad Rahmat bin Makasuf (born 28 September 1997) is a Malaysian professional footballer who plays as a winger for Malaysia Super League club Penang, on loan from Terengganu. Rahmat plays mainly as a right winger.

References

External links
 

1997 births
Living people
People from Terengganu
Malaysian footballers
Terengganu F.C. II players
Terengganu FC players
Penang F.C. players
Malaysia Super League players
Malaysian people of Malay descent
Association football forwards
Association football wingers